Darfur  is a city in Watonwan County, Minnesota, United States. The population was 108 at the 2010 census.

Geography

Minnesota State Highway 30 serves as a main route in the community.

History
Darfur was platted in April 1899 by the Chicago and North Western Railway; its incorporation as a village was completed on December 31, 1903, and it became a city on January 1, 1974, when Minnesota abolished villages. According to Warren Upham, Darfur "was named either from a region of Sudan or when two Scandinavian railroad men questioned, "why you stop dar fur?"

Demographics

2010 census
As of the census of 2010, there were 108 people, 49 households, and 30 families residing in the city. The racial makeup of the city was 94.4% White, 3.7% from other races, and 1.9% from two or more races. Hispanic or Latino of any race were 9.3% of the population.

There were 49 households, of which 24.5% had children under the age of 18 living with them, 53.1% were married couples living together, 4.1% had a female householder with no husband present, 4.1% had a male householder with no wife present, and 38.8% were non-families. 38.8% of all households were made up of individuals, and 20.4% had someone living alone who was 65 years of age or older. The average household size was 2.20 and the average family size was 2.93.

The median age in the city was 45.5 years. 23.1% of residents were under the age of 18; 5.7% were between the ages of 18 and 24; 21.3% were from 25 to 44; 30.6% were from 45 to 64; and 19.4% were 65 years of age or older. The gender makeup of the city was 50.9% male and 49.1% female.

2000 census
As of the census of 2000, there were 137 people, 58 households, and 44 families residing in the city. The racial makeup of the city was 134 white people and 3 Asian people. There are no blacks or Hispanics.

There were 58 households, out of which 31.0% had children under the age of 18 living with them, 62.1% were married couples living together, 8.6% had a female householder with no husband present, and 24.1% were non-families. 22.4% of all households were made up of individuals, and 12.1% had someone living alone who was 65 years of age or older. The average household size was 2.36 and the average family size was 2.64.

In the city, the population was spread out, with 24.8% under the age of 18, 8.0% from 18 to 24, 27.7% from 25 to 44, 13.9% from 45 to 64, and 25.5% who were 65 years of age or older. The median age was 40 years. For every 100 females, there were 117.5 males. For every 100 females age 18 and over, there were 106.0 males.

The median income for a household in the city was $31,563, and the median income for a family was $32,750. Males had a median income of $30,000 versus $18,125 for females. The per capita income for the city was $14,300. There were 4.1% of families and 7.1% of the population living below the poverty line, including 5.6% of under eighteen and none of those over 64.

Notes

Cities in Minnesota
Cities in Watonwan County, Minnesota
Populated places established in 1899
1899 establishments in Minnesota